Maximilian Lenz may refer to:

 Maximilian Lenz (1860–1948), Austrian artist
 WestBam (1965–), real name Maximilian Lenz, German musician

See also 
 Max Lenz (1850–1931), German historian